The 2023 Cork Premier Junior Hurling Championship is scheduled to be the second staging of the Cork Premier Junior Hurling Championship since its establishment by the Cork County Board in 2022. The draw for the group stage placings took place on 11 December 2022. The championship is scheduled to run from July to October 2023.

Team changes

To Championship

Relegated from the Cork Intermediate A Hurling Championship
 Meelin

Promoted from the Cork Junior A Hurling Championship
 Erin's Own

From Championship

Promoted to the Cork Intermediate A Hurling Championship
 Ballygiblin

Relegated to the Mid Cork Junior A Hurling Championship
 Dripsey

Group A

Group A table

Group B

Group B table

Group C

Group C table

Knockout stage

Relegation playoff

Quarter-finals

Semi-finals

Final

References

External links
 Cork GAA website

Cork Premier Junior Hurling Championship
Cork Premier Junior Hurling Championship
Cork Premier Junior Hurling Championship